Topolc (in older sources: Topolec) is a village immediately northwest of Ilirska Bistrica in the Inner Carniola region of Slovenia.

Mass grave
Topolc is the site of a mass grave from the end of the Second World War.

Church
The local church in the settlement is dedicated to Saint Stephen and belongs to the Parish of Ilirska Bistrica.

References

External links

Topolc on Geopedia

Populated places in the Municipality of Ilirska Bistrica